Gulzira Iskakova (born 4 November 1988) is a handball player from Kazakhstan. She plays on the Kazakhstan women's national handball team, and participated at the 2011 World Women's Handball Championship in Brazil. She competed at the 2008 Summer Olympics in Beijing, where the Kazakhstani team placed 10th.

References

1988 births
Living people
People from Kyzylorda
Kazakhstani female handball players
Handball players at the 2010 Asian Games
Asian Games competitors for Kazakhstan
Olympic handball players of Kazakhstan
Handball players at the 2008 Summer Olympics
21st-century Kazakhstani women